Darevskia saxicola  is a lizard species in the genus Darevskia. It is found in Georgia, Russia, and Turkey.

References

Darevskia
Reptiles described in 1834
Taxa named by Eduard Friedrich Eversmann
Reptiles of Russia